This is the discography of English rock and roll singer Tommy Steele, both with the Steelmen and as a solo artist.

Albums

Studio albums

Soundtrack albums

Cast recording albums

Compilation albums

EPs

Singles

Notes

References 

Discographies of British artists
Rock music discographies